TUSM may refer to:
Temple University School of Medicine, in the United States
Tufts University School of Medicine, in the United States
Shanghai Tongji University School of Medicine, in Shanghi, China
SC-89 (TUSM), a surface mount device manufactured by Renesas Electronics